Midtjyllands Airport , formerly known as Karup Airport, is an airport in Denmark. The airport is situated 3 km west of the town of Karup and carries passengers primarily from nine municipalities in mid- and west Jutland that also own the airport. Air Base Karup, the primary base of the Royal Danish Air Force, is situated within the airport.

History
The airport is based on a military airfield constructed during the German occupation in 1940. After the war, the Royal Danish Air Force took control of the field which is still its main base.

At the request of some middle- and west-Jutland politicians, the airport was opened on 1 November 1965 when the first direct connection between Karup and Copenhagen was opened. In 1968 the airport's first terminal was built. Until then, it had rented premises at the airbase.

Airport ownership consisted of Viborg and Ringkjøbing county council districts and the municipalities of Herning, Holstebro, Viborg, Skive, Ikast, Karup, Struer, Ringkøbing, Lemvig, and Skjern. It was agreed that Det Danske Luftfartsselskab - later SAS - would start flying on the route in exchange for a subsidy by the owners. In the beginning there was a single daily departure with a 15-passenger de Havilland Heron airplane. The route was a success and there was no need for the subsidy. On the contrary, the airport's ongoing development was paid for with the operating income and no additional public support aside from the owners' initial deposits.

In 1991 the present terminal, Glass House on the Heath designed by Architect Firm Torsten Riis Andersen, was inaugurated.

Lemvig and Skjern municipality sold their shares to Karup council (now Viborg council) in 2002. As of 1 January 2007 the owners are Herning, Holstebro, Ikast-Brande, Lemvig, Ringkobing-Skjern, Silkeborg, Skive, Struer, and Viborg municipalities.

In 2010 approximately 350.000 passengers used the airport.

Karup lost scheduled flights when Cimber Sterling, the only operator at the airport, declared bankruptcy and cancelled all flights on 3 May 2012. However, by sheer luck, Norwegian Air Shuttle announced four daily flights to Copenhagen on an all-year basis, operated by a Boeing 737-800 just after Cimber shut down. This was eventually replaced by an ATR 72 operated by Danish Air Transport, who became the only operator on the route after Norwegian Air Shuttle ended its route on 27 March 2015.

The Air Base Karup is home to several wings of the Royal Danish Air Force, including the helicopter wings, the flying school, the air control wing and several fighter wings.

Airlines and destinations

As of 14 January 2023, there are no regular commercial passenger flights to/from Midtjllands airport.

Statistics

See also
 List of the largest airports in the Nordic countries

References 

 AIP Denmark: Karup - EKKA
 VFR Flight Guide Denmark: Karup - EKKA

External links

Official website
 
Flyvestation Karup 

Airports in Denmark
Buildings and structures in the Central Denmark Region
Transport in the Central Denmark Region
Airports established in 1965
1965 establishments in Denmark